The KAB-1500S-E is a precision guided bomb, part of KAB-1500 family, designed for the Russian Federation Air Force (RFAF) to carry out precision attacks, using 24-channel GLONASS and is equivalent to the United States Air Force (USAF) Joint Direct Attack Munition (JDAM) family of Global Positioning System (GPS) guided weapons.

It is believed to be similar to the KAB-500S-E, and to use the same Kompas PSN-2001 (Pribor Sputnikovoy Navigatsii) satellite receiver. The manufacturer, Tactical Missiles Corporation aka KTRV, has fully completed testing of products of the K08B and K029B (UPAB-1500B) types, both products are in serial production and are delivered to combat units. 

Russia intends to fit it to the Su-24M, Su-34, Su-35 and Mig-35 aircraft. They hope to export to India and China.

See also
KAB-1500L

References

Guided bombs
Aerial bombs of Russia